

In classical field theories, the Lagrangian specification of the flow field is a way of looking at fluid motion where the observer follows an individual fluid parcel as it moves through space and time. Plotting the position of an individual parcel through time gives the pathline of the parcel. This can be visualized as sitting in a boat and drifting down a river.

The Eulerian specification of the flow field is a way of looking at fluid motion that focuses on specific locations in the space through which the fluid flows as time passes. This can be visualized by sitting on the bank of a river and watching the water pass the fixed location. 

The Lagrangian and Eulerian specifications of the flow field are sometimes loosely denoted as the Lagrangian and Eulerian frame of reference. However, in general both the Lagrangian and Eulerian specification of the flow field can be applied in any observer's frame of reference, and in any coordinate system used within the chosen frame of reference.

These specifications are reflected in computational fluid dynamics, where "Eulerian" simulations employ a fixed mesh while "Lagrangian" ones (such as meshfree simulations) feature simulation nodes that may move following the velocity field.

Description 
In the Eulerian specification of a field, the field is represented as a function of position x and time t. For example, the flow velocity is represented by a function 

On the other hand, in the Lagrangian specification, individual fluid parcels are followed through time. The fluid parcels are labelled by some (time-independent) vector field x0. (Often, x0 is chosen to be the position of the center of mass of the parcels at some initial time t0. It is chosen in this particular manner to account for the possible changes of the shape over time. Therefore the center of mass is a good parameterization of the flow velocity u of the parcel.) In the Lagrangian description, the flow is described by a function

giving the position of the particle labeled x0 at time t.

The two specifications are related as follows:

because both sides describe the velocity of the particle labeled x0 at time t.

Within a chosen coordinate system, x0 and x are referred to as the Lagrangian coordinates and Eulerian coordinates of the flow respectively.

Material derivative 

The Lagrangian and Eulerian specifications of the kinematics and dynamics of the flow field are related by the material derivative (also called the Lagrangian derivative, convective derivative, substantial derivative, or particle derivative).

Suppose we have a flow field u, and we are also given a generic field with Eulerian specification F(x, t). Now one might ask about the total rate of change of F experienced by a specific flow parcel. This can be computed as

where ∇ denotes the nabla operator with respect to x, and the operator u⋅∇ is to be applied to each component of F. This tells us that the total rate of change of the function F as the fluid parcels moves through a flow field described by its Eulerian specification u is equal to the sum of the local rate of change and the convective rate of change of F. This is a consequence of the chain rule since we are differentiating the function F(X(x0, t), t) with respect to t.

Conservation laws for a unit mass have a Lagrangian form, which together with mass conservation produce Eulerian conservation; on the contrary, when fluid particles can exchange a quantity (like energy or momentum), only Eulerian conservation laws exist.

See also 
 Brewer-Dobson Circulation
 Conservation form
 Contour advection
 Equivalent latitude
 Generalized Lagrangian mean
 Lagrangian particle tracking
 Semi-Lagrangian scheme
 Streamlines, streaklines, and pathlines
 Trajectory (fluid mechanics)
 Stochastic Eulerian Lagrangian method
 Liouville's theorem (Hamiltonian)

Notes

References

External links

 Objectivity in classical continuum mechanics: Motions, Eulerian and Lagrangian functions; Deformation gradient; Lie derivatives; Velocity-addition formula, Coriolis; Objectivity.

Fluid dynamics
Aerodynamics
Computational fluid dynamics